Malmsten is a Swedish language surname which may refer to:

Bengt Malmsten, Swedish Olympic speed skater
Birger Malmsten, Swedish actor
Bodil Malmsten, Swedish poet and novelist
Carl Johan Malmsten, Swedish mathematician
Eugen Malmstén, Swedish-Finnish musician and orchestra director
Georg Malmstén, Swedish-Finnish singer and musician
Gustaf Malmsten, Swedish Olympic athlete
Mait Malmsten, Estonian actor
Staffan Malmsten, Swedish sprint canoer

See also
Yngwie Malmsteen

Swedish-language surnames